Hula is a Polynesian dance.

Hula may also refer to:

Hula hoop, a toy hoop that is twirled around the waist, limbs or neck

Places
Hula (woreda), a district in the SNNPR region of Ethiopia
Hula, Lebanon, a village originally called Hule
Hula massacre, during the 1948 Palestine War
Hula, Papua New Guinea, a town in the Rigo District
Hula language, an Oceanic language spoken in that area
Houla, a region in Syria
Houla massacre, on May 25, 2012
Hula Valley, Israel, previously Lake Hula

People
Ed Hula (born 1951), American journalist and producer
Eduard Hula (1862–1902), Austrian classical archaeologist and epigrapher
HULA (Sean Yoro, born 1989), American artist
Stefan Hula (disambiguation), several people
Lamar "Hula" Mahone, music producer and songwriter, member of The Outhere Brothers

Other uses
Hula (film), a 1927 silent film directed by Victor Fleming
Hula (software), an open-source mail and calendar software project by Novell
Project Hula, a secret program to transfer ships from the United States Navy to the Soviet Navy during World War II
Walrus HULA, a heavy-lift hybrid airship proposed by DARPA
Hula, an embroidered cap worn by the Hausa people

See also
 
 Hulu, an American entertainment company and streaming service
 Hula Hoop (disambiguation)